Aberfeldy is a small settlement located inside triangle of Phuthaditjhaba, Kestell and Harrismith surrounded by agricultural land and game farms.

The farm Aberfeldy in the Orange Free State had a post office known as Elandsrivierbrug; when the railway reached the farm in 1902 the new Orange River Colony administration preferred "Aberfeldy", Scottish in origin, to the previous Afrikaans name. By 1905 the post office name was Anglicised into Elands River Bridge.

References

Populated places in the Maluti a Phofung Local Municipality